Álvaro Cubillo de Aragón (c. 1596 – 1661) was a playwright of the Spanish Golden Age.

1590s births
1661 deaths
Spanish dramatists and playwrights
Spanish male dramatists and playwrights